A machist may be

 An exponent of machism
 An exponent of machismo

See also
 Machiste